Jeleńcz may refer to the following places in Poland:

Jeleńcz, Kuyavian-Pomeranian Voivodeship (north-central Poland)
Jeleńcz, Pomeranian Voivodeship (north Poland)